Love Takes Flight is a 1937 American drama film directed by Conrad Nagel and written by Lionel Houser and Mervin J. Houser. The film stars Bruce Cabot, Beatrice Roberts, John Sheehan, Astrid Allwyn, Elliot Fisher and Wild Bill Elliott. The film was released on November 5, 1937, by Grand National Films Inc.

Plot
Joan Lawson is flight hostess in love with the pilot, Neil Bradshaw. Neil some day wants flying solo around the world. On a flight from New York City to Los Angeles movie producer Dave Miller wants Joan to become a movie star but she wants Neil to teach her to be a pilot. The airplane is grounded in L.A due to bad weather but movie star Diane Andre, a passenger on the plane, insists that plane takes off. It does and later the plane is reported lost but it is revealed it was forced down on a mountain by the storm. While stuck on the mountain Diane offers Neil the leading man roll in her new film and he gives up his flying career. Joan decides she will go on with her flying lessons and plans to fly around the world solo.

Cast           
Bruce Cabot as Neil 'Brad' Bradshaw
Beatrice Roberts as Joan Lawson
John Sheehan as Spud Johnson
Astrid Allwyn as Diane Audre
Elliot Fisher as Tommy Lawson
Wild Bill Elliott as Bill Parker
Edwin Maxwell as Dave Miller
Harry Tyler as Harry Stone
Peter Potter as Tex Rice 
Grady Sutton as Donald
Arthur Hoyt as Grey
William L. Thorne as Bill Parker Sr. 
Brooks Benedict as Eddie
Henry Roquemore as Woodsy
Carol Tevis as Myrtle Johnson
Jack Duffy as Bartender
Reed Howes as NBC Announcer

References

External links
 

1937 films
American drama films
1937 drama films
Grand National Films films
American black-and-white films
American aviation films
1930s English-language films
1930s American films